Shell Beach, La Jolla is a small beach in La Jolla, a community of San Diego, California, United States. The beach is accessed via a flight of concrete steps that start at the south end of Ellen Browning Scripps Park. This beach is located immediately north of Children's Pool Beach, south of Boomer Beach, and also south of La Jolla Cove.

During extreme low tides, the southern end of Shell Beach has an interesting tidepool-like area, with many marine creatures visible. Because of the presence of reef structures and rip currents that can be hazardous to scuba divers, the San Diego Council of Divers provides a "Rocks, Rips and Reefs" tour for the area. Visible to the south a short distance out from Shell Beach is Seal Rock, which often has a number of harbor seals resting on it. There is presence of sea glass on the beach.

See also
 List of beaches in San Diego County
 List of California state parks

References

Beaches of Southern California
La Jolla, San Diego
Beaches of San Diego County, California